1134NYC was an art collective based in Brooklyn, New York City. The 1134nyc bomb logo was created by Mint and Hek. The name 1134 was chosen due to some members from the collective being in a graffiti crew titled 1134. The NYC was added to the logo in order to separate the newly formed art collective from the graffiti crew. It began as a collective of artists and designers including MINT&SERF (MIRF), GOAL, HEILS, BOO, CH, CECS, VYELS, KEVS and OUCH (RIP). Over the years more artists and musicians joined and collaborated with 1134NYC on different art related projects in galleries, clubs and streets. The logo has appeared on a plethora of art object; shirts, street signs, stickers and canvases. 1134NYC has also been referenced in China Doll, a Team Facelift song off Manhattan album to be released on Duck Down records. 

They are known for their public art, graffiti, laser-cut stickers and stencils. 

The stencils, which feature the number 1134 and a bomb, were mistaken for a terrorist threat in 2004. "Some theorized the '1134' referred to November 3, 2004, the day after Election Day, while others postulated it was a Europeanization of the date of the Madrid bombings on March 11, 2004. All thought that the “NYC” appearing in the bomb was a reference to a planned attack, communicated by the stenciled logo they spotted on the city streets."

They have also contributed to Mass Appeal Magazine, a special edition of the book, Autograf by Peter Sutherland, and foreign magazines and books.

About Mint&Serf:

Mikhail Sokovikov and Jason Aaron Wall are New York based visual artists. With financial backing from Red Bull N.A. they launched The Canal Chapter in 2005, a multi-disciplinary art gallery in SoHo neighborhood of Manhattan, that created a platform for many emerging artists such as Team Facelift, Lance de los Reyes, Jordan Seiler, Harif Guzman, Victor Timofeev and many others. After the success of The Canal Chapter, they launched The Stanton Chapter in May 2008, a gallery in Lower East Side neighborhood of Manhattan. Mikhail Sokovikov and Jason Aaron Wall have exhibited extensively throughout the United States and abroad. They have created commissioned work for Ace Hotel, Nike, Red Bull, Ogilvy & Mather, Adidas, Yahoo, Boost Mobile, PowerHouse Books among other clients.

Mint&Serf curated  original art work for the Ace Hotel in New York City. They invited some of their friends to create original pieces for the project. Artists include: Brian Procell, Enjoy Banking, Faust, Machine (Team Facelift), Mosco, PegLeg, Pork, Pablo Powers, Jordan Seiler, Stephen Holding, Sean Vegezzi and Tristan Eaton.

References

External links
 Themirf.com
 Mintandserf.com 
 Official Website
 Canalchapternyc.com

American graffiti artists